Diaphragmatic paradox or paradoxical diaphragm phenomenon is an abnormal medical sign observed during respiration, in which the diaphragm moves opposite to the normal directions of its movements. The diaphragm normally moves downwards during inspiration and upwards during expiration. But in diaphragmatic paradox, it moves upwards during inspiration and downwards during expiration.

Causes and associated conditions

Diaphragmatic paradox may be caused by weakening of inspiratory muscles due to injury, pyopneumothorax (collection of pus and excess air inside pleural cavity) or hydropneumothorax (collection of watery fluid and excess air inside pleural cavity). Also caused due to phrenic nerve injury caused during cardiac surgery, radiation, trauma, etc. Viral infections like Herpes zoster and poliomyelitis can also cause this. In newborns this condition is seen in spinal muscular atrophy.

See also
Flail chest (or Paradoxical breathing).

References

Symptoms and signs: Respiratory system